The Nevado El Cisne is a volcano in the Central Ranges of the Andes in Colombia. The mountain is one of the five lava domes of the Nevado del Ruiz volcano complex. Despite the nevado part of the name, indicating a permanently snow-capped mountain, the summit of El Cisne is now below the permanent snow line as a result of global warming, and it is no longer considered a true nevado. The volcano is located over the Palestina Fault, that crosscuts the underlying El Bosque Batholith of Eocene age, dated at 49.1 ± 1.7 Ma.

See also 
 List of volcanoes in Colombia
 List of volcanoes by elevation

References

Bibliography 
 
 

Mountains of Colombia
Volcanoes of Colombia
Andean Volcanic Belt
Quaternary Colombia
Geography of Caldas Department
Geography of Tolima Department
Four-thousanders of the Andes
Lava domes